George Gardiner Scott (11 June 1915 – 26 July 1942) was a Scottish professional football inside right who played in the Scottish League for East Fife and Aberdeen.

Personal life 
Scott attended Lumphinnans Primary School. In 1941, during the Second World War, he enlisted in the RAF and during a period training in Canada, met and married his wife Jessie. Scott returned to Scotland in 1942 and was posted to No. 19 Operational Training Unit at RAF Kinloss. On 26 July 1942, Sergeant Scott, serving as an air gunner on board an Armstrong Whitworth Whitley, took off from RAF Kinloss to conduct a cross-country training exercise. The aircraft suffered engine failure in mid-air, caught fire, and crashed into the Dornoch Firth off Tain, killing all 5 on board, including Scott. The Whitley was attempting to get to RAF Tain when it crashed. His body was not recovered and he is commemorated on the Air Forces Memorial.

Career statistics

References

1942 deaths
1915 births
Royal Air Force personnel killed in World War II
Association football inside forwards
Scottish footballers
St Andrews United F.C. players
Aberdeen F.C. players
Lochgelly Albert F.C. players
Scottish Football League players
East Fife F.C. players
People from Cowdenbeath
Scottish military personnel
Royal Air Force airmen
Footballers from Fife
Scottish Junior Football Association players